This is a list of English language words from the Irish language with links provided to pronunciation in all three primarily Irish dialects, spoken by native Irish speakers, provided by Foras na Gaeilge.

banshee (from Irish bainsídhe/beansídhe, meaning "woman of fairy" or "of a fairy mound"Bean (ban) is the Modern Irish word for woman.  (modern spelling sí) is Irish for 'mound' (see Sidhe). In traditional Irish mythology, a spirit usually taking the form of a woman who sings a caoineadh (lament) warning of impending death in an old Irish family.
bog (from "boc", meaning "soft" or "marshy" and -aigh to form bogach meaning "soft soil composed primarily of peat") Used as the Anglicized "bog" as slang for a mire, but also to become stuck or impeded.
bogeyman (possibly from bogaigh + English man) The word bogaigh is pronounced approximately as "boggy", and the bogeyman legend originates from humanoid-appearing logs and human "bog-bodies" found well-preserved in peat. These occasional discoveries gave rise to unsettling stories some suggest may have been used to encourage good behavior from otherwise misbehaving children.
boreen (from bóithrín, meaning "country lane") A narrow, rural Irish road.
bother (possibly from bodhar, "deaf; bothered; confused"; or from bodhraigh, "to deafen; to annoy") The earliest use appears in the writings of Irish authors Sheridan, Swift and Sterne.
brock (from old Irish brocc) A badger.
brat (from Old Irish bratt meaning "cloak, mantle") A cloak covering or cloth. Also as swadding-clothes and bird's plumage.
brogan (from bróg, meaning "shoe" or "boot".) A boot or shoe of untanned leather, often with holes in the sides or over the toes intended for drying while worn in wet conditions.
brogue (from barróg, meaning "to wrestle or grasp" with teanga (tongue) to mean an impediment of speech.) Though found in wide use in English to indicate a heavy accent, the Irish do not use this term for the negative connotations.

clabber, clauber (from clábar) wet clay or mud; curdled milk.
clock O.Ir.  meaning "bell"; into Old High German as glocka, klocka<ref name=Kluge>Kluge, F. Etymologisches Wörterbuch der deutschen Sprache (1989) de Gruyter </ref> (whence Modern German Glocke) and back into English via Flemish; cf also Welsh cloch but the giving language is Old Irish via the hand-bells used by early Irish missionaries.Online Etymology Dictionary by Douglas Harper
colleen (from cailín meaning "young woman") a girl (usually referring to an Irish girl) (OED).
corrie a cirque or mountain lake, of glacial origin. (OED) Irish or Scots Gaelic coire 'Cauldron, hollow'
craic fun, used in Ireland for fun/enjoyment. The word is actually English in origin; it entered into Irish from the English "crack" via Ulster Scots. The Gaelicised spelling craic was then reborrowed into English. The craic spelling, although preferred by many Irish people, has garnered some criticism as a faux-Irish word.
cross The ultimate source of this word is Latin crux, the Roman gibbet which became a symbol of Christianity. Some sources say the English wordform comes from Old Irish cros. Other sources say the English comes from Old French crois and others say it comes from Old Norse kross.
drum (ridge), drumlin (from drom/druim meaning "ridge") a ridge often separating two long narrow valleys; a long narrow ridge of drift or diluvial formation. Drumlin is a linguistic diminutive of drum, and it means a small rounded hill of glacial formation, often seen in series (OED). A landscape of many Drumlins occurs in some parts of Ireland (including counties Cavan and Armagh). Drumlin is an established technical word in geology, but drum is almost never used.
drisheen (from drisín or drúishin).
dulse (from Old Irish duilesc).
esker (from eiscir) an elongated mound of post-glacial gravel, usually along a river valley (OED). Esker is a technical word in geology.
Fenian (from Fianna meaning "semi-independent warrior band") a member of a 19th-century Irish nationalist group (OED).
fiacre a small four-wheeled carriage for hire, a hackney-coach. Saint Fiacre was a seventh-century Irish-born saint who lived in France for most of his life. The English word fiacre comes from French. (OED)
Gallowglass (from gallóglach) a Scottish Gaelic mercenary soldier in Ireland between mid 13th and late 16th centuries.
galore (from go leor meaning "til plenty") a lot (OED).
gob (literally beak) mouth, though used in colloquial Irish more often to refer to a 'beaky' nose, i.e. a sticky-beak. Perhaps from Irish. (OED)
griskin (from griscín) a lean cut of meat from the loin of a pig.
hooligan (from the Irish family name Ó hUallacháin, anglicised as O'Houlihan) one who takes part in rowdy behaviour and vandalism.
keening (from caoinim  meaning "I wail") to lament, to wail mournfully (OED). No relation to "keen" = eager.
kibosh, kybosh to finish, to put an end to: "That's put the kibosh on it". The OED says the origin is obscure and possibly Yiddish. Other sources suggest that it may be from the Irish  meaning "the cap of death" (a reference to the "black cap" worn by a judge passing sentence of capital punishment, or perhaps to the gruesome method of execution called pitchcapping); or else somehow connected with "bosh", from Turkish "boş" (empty). (Caip bháis - pronounced as kibosh - is also a word in Irish for a candle-snuffer.)
Leprechaun (from leipreachán, based on Old Irish luchorpán, from lu 'small' + corp 'body' (ODE).
Limerick (from Luimneach)
lough (from loch) a lake, or arm of the sea. According to the OED, the spelling "lough" was originally a separate word with a similar meaning but different pronunciation, perhaps from Old Northumbrian: this word became obsolete, effectively from the 16th century, but in Anglo-Irish its spelling was retained for the word newly borrowed from Irish.
phoney (probably from the English  meaning "gilt brass ring used by swindlers", which is from Irish  meaning "ring") fake.
poteen (from póitín) hooch, bootleg alcoholic drink (OED)
shamrock (from seamróg) a clover, used as a symbol for Ireland (OED).
Shan Van Vocht (from sean-bhean bhocht meaning "poor old woman") a literary name for Ireland in the 18th and 19th centuries.
shebeen (from síbín meaning "a mugful") unlicensed house selling alcohol (OED).
shillelagh (from sail éille meaning "a club with a strap") a wooden club or cudgel made from a stout knotty stick with a large knob on the end.
Sidhe the fairy folk of Ireland, from (aos) sídhe (OED). See banshee.
sleveen, sleiveen (from slíghbhín/slíbhín) an untrustworthy or cunning person. Used in Ireland and Newfoundland (OED).
slew (from sluagh meaning "a large number") a great amount (OED). Note: as in a slew of new products, not as in slay.
slob (from slab) mud (OED). Note: the English words slobber and slobbery do not come from this; they come from Old English.
slogan (from sluagh-ghairm meaning "a battle-cry used by Gaelic clans") Meaning of a word or phrase used by a specific group is metaphorical and first attested from 1704.
smithereens small fragments, atoms. In phrases such as 'to explode into smithereens'. This is the word smithers (of obscure origin) with the Irish diminutive ending. Whether it derives from the modern Irish smidrín or is the source of this word is unclear (OED).
tilly (from tuilleadh meaning "a supplement") used to refer to an additional article or amount unpaid for by the purchaser, as a gift from the vendor (OED). Perhaps more prevalent in Newfoundland than Ireland. James Joyce, in his Pomes Penyeach included a thirteenth poem as a bonus (as the book sold for a shilling, twelve poems would have come to a penny each), which he named "Tilly," for the extra sup of milk given to customers by milkmen in Dublin.
tory originally an Irish outlaw, probably from the Irish verb tóir meaning "pursue" (OED).
turlough a seasonal lake in limestone area (OED) Irish  tur loch 'dry lake'
whiskey (from uisce beatha'' meaning "water of life") (OED).

See also
 Hiberno-English
 List of English words of Scottish Gaelic origin
 Lists of English words of Celtic origin
 Lists of English words of international origin

References

Further reading 
 Concise English-Irish Dictionary (Foras na Gaeilge, 2020, ISBN 978-1-85791-024-1)

Irish
Words